Zasulauks Station is a railway station serving the neighbourhood of Zasulauks in the district of Kurzeme in Riga, Latvia. The station is located on the Torņakalns – Tukums II Railway which connects Riga with Tukums.

References

External links

Railway stations in Riga
Railway stations opened in 1873